Live in Prowinzz is the third album from the Leningrad Cowboys.  It was recorded at Provinssirock–festival, Seinäjoki on 6 June 1992. It was released in 1992.

Track listing

References

Leningrad Cowboys albums
1992 live albums